New Berlin High School is a coeducational public high school serving the community of New Berlin, Illinois and surrounding areas within Sangamon County, including but not limited to: Loami, Berlin, Curran, Island Grove, and the west side of Springfield. For the 2021–2022 school year, the school had 278 students enrolled in grades 9–12.

The school's current principal, Hattie Llewellyn; Superintendent, Jill Larson.

Athletics
New Berlin High School's athletic teams are known as the "Pretzels" and compete in thirteen sports and activities sanctioned by the Illinois High School Association. The school has athletic and activities co-op agreements with multiple schools in surrounding communities, including Waverly, Franklin, and Pleasant Plains.

Sexual abuse lawsuit
In September 2018, a former student filed a civil lawsuit against the school district, alleging sexual abuse over a period of four years in the late 1980s by a former teacher at the school.

External links
Official website
Official website of the school's athletic teams and activities

References

Public high schools in Illinois
Schools in Sangamon County, Illinois
Education in Sangamon County, Illinois